Theodor Sele (born 20 April 1931) is a Liechtensteiner former alpine skier who competed in the 1948 Winter Olympics and in the 1956 Winter Olympics.

References

External links
 

1931 births
Living people
Liechtenstein male alpine skiers
Olympic alpine skiers of Liechtenstein
Alpine skiers at the 1948 Winter Olympics
Alpine skiers at the 1956 Winter Olympics